Santa's Village may refer to:
The mythological Santa's workshop

In the United States:
 Santa's Village AZoosment Park, an amusement park in East Dundee, Illinois
 Santa's Village (Jefferson, New Hampshire), an amusement park
 Santa's Village (Lake Arrowhead), a tourist attraction in Lake Arrowhead, California
 Santa's Village (Scotts Valley), a former tourist attraction in Scotts Valley, California

In Canada:
 Santa's Village Family Entertainment Park, an amusement park in Bracebridge, Ontario

In Finland:
 Santa Claus Village, located along the Arctic Circle, about 8 km northeast of Rovaniemi